Mauricio Romero Sellares (born 1 August 1979) is a Colombian retired football (soccer) midfielder.

Currently he is the president of América de Cali of the Categoría Primera A in Colombia.

References

External links
 

1979 births
Living people
Association football midfielders
Colombian footballers
América de Cali footballers
Once Caldas footballers
Deportivo Pasto footballers
Deportes Quindío footballers
CD Castellón footballers
Atlético Bucaramanga footballers
Atlético Junior footballers
Cúcuta Deportivo footballers
Cienciano footballers
Estudiantes de Mérida players
Real Esppor Club players
Colombian expatriate footballers
Expatriate footballers in Spain
Expatriate footballers in Peru
Expatriate footballers in Venezuela
Orsomarso S.C. footballers
América de Cali presidents
Footballers from Cali